Kankakee High School (KHS) is a public secondary school in Kankakee, Illinois and is part of the Kankakee School District 111. KHS serves grades nine through twelve.

History
Kankakee High School was established in 1906 and served students until 1966. In 1966, KHS split into two schools, one called Eastridge (team named the Raiders) and the other called Westview (team named the Kayhawks or K-Hawks). These two schools operated until 1983 when it unified once again to form the new KHS.

Activities 

 Art Club
 Band
 Orchestra 
 Book Club
 Chess Club
 Choir
 Show Choir
 Gay/Straight Alliance (GSA)
 Mathletes
 National Honor Society (NHS)
 Robotics
 Scholastic Bowl
 Student Council

Athletics 
KHS currently has the following sports:
 Football
Basketball (boys and girls)
 Baseball
 Softball
 Volleyball
 Swimming (boys and girls)
 Soccer (boys and girls)
Track (boys and girls)
 Cross Country (boys and girls)
 Cheerleading
 Tennis (boys and girls)
 Powerlifting (boys and girls)
 Wrestling (boys and girls)
 Bowling (boys and girls)
 Golf (boys and girls)
 Esports

Demographics
 Black: 44.5%
 Hispanic: 33.4%
 White: 20.8%
 Asian: 0.5%
 Native American: 0%
 Other: 0.9%

References

Sources
Kankakee High School / Homepage. (2023)

External links
 

Public high schools in Illinois
Kankakee, Illinois
Schools in Kankakee County, Illinois